Tibotec was a pharmaceutical company with a focus on research and development for the treatment of infectious diseases such as HIV/AIDS and hepatitis C. The company was founded in 1994 and then acquired by Johnson & Johnson and merged into its Janssen Pharmaceuticals division in 2002.

History
In 1994, Rudi Pauwels of the Rega Institute for Medical Research founded Tibotec, together with his wife Carine Claeys, and their first co-workers Marie-Pierre de Béthune, Kurt Hertogs, and Hilde Azijn. In 1995 Paul Stoffels (Janssen Pharmaceuticals) joined Tibotec. The company was acquired by Johnson & Johnson in April 2002. The name of the company is derived from the tetrahydro-imidazo[4,5,1-jk][1,4]-benzodiazepine-2(1H)-one and -thione (TIBO) compounds discovered at the Rega Institute for Medical Research (Belgium).

Drugs
 Darunavir (TMC114, tradename Prezista), a protease inhibitor
 Etravirine (TMC125, tradename Intelence), a non-nucleoside reverse transcriptase inhibitor (NNRTI)
 Bedaquiline (TMC207/R207910, tradename Sirturo), an  diarylquinoline anti-tuberculosis drug
 Rilpivirine (TMC278, tradename Edurant), an NNRTI
 Simeprevir (TMC435, tradename Olysio), an HCV NS3/4A protease inhibitor for treatment of chronic hepatitis C in combination with pegylated interferon/ribavirin or with other direct-acting anti-HCV agents.
 Dapivirine (TMC120), an NNRTI licensed to the International Partnership for Microbicides for its development as a vaginal microbicide in March 2004.

See also
Galapagos NV
FlandersBio

References

External links
Tibotec

Pharmaceutical companies of Belgium
Johnson & Johnson subsidiaries
Pharmaceutical companies established in 1994
Defunct pharmaceutical companies
2002 mergers and acquisitions